Isabel Meadows (July 7, 1846 – 1939) was an Ohlone ethnologist and the last fluent speaker of the Rumsen Ohlone language. She also spoke Esselen. She worked closely with the anthropologists from the Smithsonian Institution for more than five years in order to document her culture and language. Her work is considered fundamental in the study of Ohlone languages.

Family 

Isabel Meadows was born on July 7, 1846 in Carmel Valley, California. Her lineage included English, Esselen and Rumsen heritage. Her father, James Meadows, worked as a whaler. He later owned a James Meadows Tract in upper Carmel Valley in the vicinity of a cave in which an Esselen child was found buried in 1952. Isabel's great-grandmother Lupecina Francesa Unegte had been baptized at the Mission San Carlos Borromeo in 1792 when about 800 Native Americans lived there. William Brainard Post worked on Meadows Ranch and married Isabel's aunt Anselma in 1850. 

She spoke of her childhood community as a disordered and traumatized one, featuring abuse, abandonment and addiction, the latter resulting from pain and ending in death, she said.  

Due in part to her ancestry and childhood, she was competent to fluent in Rumsen, English and Spanish. Isabel is known as the last fluent speaker of the Rumsen Ohlone language which had been commonly spoken along the Central Coast of California prior to the arrival of the Spanish. Her body was returned to Carmel for a memorial service. She was survived by one brother, Thomas Meadows of Monterey, and his children.

Smithsonian collaboration 

In her later years and until her death, Isabel worked closely with Smithsonian ethnologist J. P. Harrington and shared her knowledge of her tribe's culture and languages in the Monterey, Carmel, and Big Sur regions of California. Drawing upon her ancestry, she provided oral history on the likes of Spanish missions, ranchos, and the California Gold Rush. His primary correspondent, their work was extensive and comprehensive. He insisted upon her input and their affairs were amicable as she provided personal tales, per her desire, and the fundamentals Harrington sought. She credited the fatal effect alcoholism had on her community with the lack of preservation for the Rumsen Ohlone language. 

Harrington's practice functioned as salvage ethnography; Isabel was "one of the last survivors who could retrace the sweeping and succeeding colonial forms of violence by the Spanish, Mexican and U.S. American imperial and settler colonial systems in California".

Deborah A. Miranda noted that much of Isabel's recollection functions as gossip, although expressing solidarity rather than judgement. She spoke passionately in remembrance of a rape, information which was likely disseminated by gossip.

Death
Meadows and Harrington worked together until the end of her life, on May 20, 1939 at age 94, in Washington D.C. In 1949, the Meadows Cave was discovered by a survey party under the direction of A.R. Piling, then assistant Archaeologist of the U.C. Archaeological Survey. The cave was renamed after Isabella Meadows, as the last known informant on the Esselen Native Americans.

References

External links 
 
Isabel Meadows Papers at the California Language Archive

Ohlone
1846 births
1939 deaths
Last known speakers of a Native American language
19th-century Native Americans
Native American history of California
19th-century Native American women